The 1991 Eastern Illinois Panthers football team represented Eastern Illinois University as a member of the Gateway Collegiate Athletic Conference (GCAC) during the 1991 NCAA Division I-AA football season. Led by fifth-year head coach Bob Spoo, the Panthers played their home games at O'Brien Stadium in Charleston, Illinois. Eastern Illinois finished the season with on overall record of 4–7 and a conference mark of 2–4, tying for fifth place.

Schedule

References

Eastern Illinois
Eastern Illinois Panthers football seasons
Eastern Illinois Panthers football